FC Lebap is a Turkmenistan football club based in Türkmenabat. Since 2015 they play in the second division, the Birinji liga. Their home stadium is Türkmenabat Stadium which can hold 10,000 people.

History
The club takes part in the championship of Turkmenistan since 1992.

From the 1996 the name of the club added Eskavatorshik. In the winter break Championship 1997–98 club changed its name to Jeyhun.

Since 2002, the club was called Garagum. That year the team won the Cup of Turkmenistan, and among the leading players were Vitaly Alekperov, Zarif Ereshev, Yazguly Hodjageldiev, Berdy Nurmuradov, Nikolay Yermilov (goalkeeper, which reflected two penalties in the shoot-out in the Cup final).

In 2003 the team was suspected of intentional failure to check out the games, which is why the 2nd part of the championship club missed.

Because of financial difficulties did not participate in the championship of Turkmenistan until 2008.

From 2013 club began performing under the name Bagtyyarlyk-Lebap.

Honours
 Turkmenistan Cup: 1
 Winner :2002
 Ýokary Liga:
 3rd place: 1996, 2002, 2010

Personnel

References

Links
Official website

Football clubs in Turkmenistan
2008 establishments in Turkmenistan
Association football clubs established in 2008